Tankcsapda is a Hungarian heavy metal and hard rock band.

History
Tankcsapda was formed in 1989, in Debrecen, Hungary. The group started off as a power trio with only drums, bass and guitar playing punk rock, but continuously expanded their repertoire with different elements of rock music. They initially performed in small venues and published their album on small independent labels. The band's first important commercial development came in 1995, with the release of their fourth album, Az Ember Tervez (Man Makes Plans), which has become the first gold record for Tankcsapda.

In 2003, they finally crossed over to the mainstream, with the release of their Élni vagy Égni (To Live or to Burn) album, and two singles off this record: "Be Vagyok Rúgva" ("I'm Drunk") and "Örökké Tart" ("Lasts Forever").
After the album of 2003 and the successful compilation album that followed, they released one of their heaviest albums to date, Mindenki Vár Valamit (Everyone's Expecting Something), succeeded by a live album Elektromágnes (Electromagnet). Their newest studio album, released in 2014, is Urai vagyunk a helyzetnek (We Are On Top of the Situation). Tankcsapda completed its first US tour in the fall of 2015 with Sledgeback.

Discography

Albums:
Baj Van!! (1989) (There Is Trouble!!)
Punk and Roll (1990)
Legjobb Méreg (1992) (The Best Poison)
Jönnek A Férgek (1994) (The Worms Are Comin')
Az Ember Tervez (1995) (Man Plans)
Eleven (1996) (Vivid/Lively)
Cause for Sale (1996)
Connektor:567 (1997)
Ha Zajt Akartok (1998) (If You Want Noise)
Tankológia (1999) (Tankology)
Ez Az A ház - Maxi (2000) (This is the House)
Agyarország (2001) (Magyarország = Hungary, Agyarország = Tusk Country)
Baj Van (2002) (There Is Trouble)
Szextárgy - Maxi (2003) (Sex Object)
Élni vagy Égni (2003) (To Live or To Burn)
A Legjobb Mérgek - Best Of (2004) (The Best Poisons - Best Of)
Mindenki Vár Valamit (2006) (Everyone Waits for Somethin')
Elektromágnes (2007) (Electromagnet)
Minden Jót (2009) (All the Best)
Rockmafia Debrecen (2012) (Rock Mafia in Debrecen)
Igazi hiénák (2013) (True Hyenas)
Urai vagyunk a helyzetnek (2014) (We Are On Top of the Situation)
Liliput hollywood (2020)

Band members

Current lineup
László Lukács – vocals/bass guitar (1993–present); vocals/lead guitar (1989–1993)
Tamás Fejes – drums (2000–present)
Gábor Sidlovics - guitar (2012–present)

Former members
Attila "Labi" Tóth Laboncz – bass guitar (1989–1993)
György Buzsik – drums (1989–1997)
Ottó Elek – drums (1997–2000)
Levente "Cseresznye" ("Cherry") Molnár – lead guitar (1993–2012)

References

Hungarian heavy metal musical groups
Musical groups established in 1989
Musical trios